Victoria Falls Primary School (or Vic Falls Primary) is an independent, preparatory, day school for boys and girls in the town of Victoria Falls, Matabeleland North, Zimbabwe. The school was opened in September 1991 at its present location.

Victoria Falls Primary School is a member of the Association of Trust Schools (ATS) and the Headmaster is a member of the Conference of Heads of Independent Schools in Zimbabwe (CHISZ).

Academics
Victoria Falls Primary offers the following subjects: Art, Craft, Design and Technology, Domestic Science, English Language, General Paper, Information Communication Technology, Ndebele and Physical Education.

Sports
At Victoria Falls Primary, the following sports are available: athletics, cricket, cross country, hockey, netball, rugby, soccer, swimming and tennis. The sports on offer varies on a termly basis. The table below indicates which sports are offered in a particular term:

Extra-curricular

Clubs and societies
The following clubs and societies are on offer: Art, Choir, Conservation, Craft, Domestic Science, Early Act (Junior Interact - Part of Rotary Zimbabwe), Home Economics, ICTClub - Digitalbase, Ndebele, Scripture Union and Water Polo.

All children are expected to participate in at least one cultural activity at the school.

Outdoor Education
The school organises field trips, outdoor and adventurous activities for pupils as class visits in the town of Victoria Falls as well as Bulawayo, Matopos, Lowveld, Triangle, the Eastern Highlands, Shangani, Masvingo, and Kariba.

See also

 List of schools in Zimbabwe

References

External links
  Official website
  on the ATS website

Private schools in Zimbabwe
Day schools in Zimbabwe
Co-educational schools in Zimbabwe
Educational institutions established in 1991
1991 establishments in Zimbabwe
Member schools of the Association of Trust Schools
Education in Matabeleland North Province